Bill Watterson's comic strip Calvin and Hobbes features a wide range of secondary characters. These range from Calvin's fellow students at school to monsters and aliens from Calvin's vivid imagination.

Calvin's family

Watterson has never given Calvin's parents' names "because as far as the strip is concerned, they are important only as Calvin's mom and dad." Like Hobbes, they serve as counterpoints to Calvin's attitude and view of the world. However, Watterson sometimes uses them to explore situations adults can relate to, such as the desire to enjoy leisure time as opposed to the need to work, or bad customer service and frustrations when grocery shopping. Also, occasionally Watterson takes the time to flesh out the two parental characters. One example is a storyline in which the family returns from a wedding to find their house has been broken into and ransacked. For several strips, Calvin and Hobbes fade into the background as Mom and Dad reflect on the impact of the event. Calvin's father is particularly shaken, admitting to his wife, "I don't think I'd have been in such a hurry to reach adulthood if I'd known the whole thing was going to be ad-libbed."

Calvin's father is a white-collar office worker, specifically a patent attorney, as Watterson's own father was. An outdoorsman, he enjoys bike rides and camping trips, sometimes in extreme weather, and insists that these activities, like Calvin's chores, "build character". Though his age is never specified, when Calvin offers him a bowl of chocolate cereal, he replies "No thanks, I'm trying to reach middle age." He often responds to Calvin's questions with deliberate lies as a private joke; for example, when Calvin asks where babies come from, his dad responds that "most people just go to Sears, buy the assembly kit, and follow the step-by-step instructions," but that Calvin was "a blue light special at K-Mart. Almost as good, and a lot cheaper." Calvin sometimes treats his dad's role in his life as a political office, and will give his dad reports on his "polls" regarding his performance, often suggesting that his dad is in danger of being voted out.

Calvin's mother is a stay-at-home mom who is frequently exasperated by Calvin's antics. Before Calvin's birth, she worked a stressful job filled with aggravation, which Calvin's father claims is the reason she was better prepared to stay at home and raise Calvin. Whether or not he was jesting is debatable. On the rare occasions when she is not reacting to Calvin's misbehavior, she seems to enjoy quiet activities, such as gardening and reading. She is frequently the one forced to curb Calvin's destructive tendencies; in one Sunday strip, she allows Calvin to smoke a cigarette in order to teach him how unpleasant smoking can be. (Watterson has said he regrets the fact that the strip mostly shows her impatient side.) In another strip, she voices a wish that Calvin will one day have a child like himself, so he can understand what he puts her through, and Calvin retorts that her own mother used to say the same thing about her. She also usually seems sympathetic towards her son's relationship with Hobbes, and a few times has found herself speaking to Hobbes as well, though this embarrasses her.

Early on in the strip, Watterson says, the parent characters were criticized by readers for being overly sarcastic and insufficiently patient, especially Calvin's father, who has several times reminded his wife that he at first wanted a dachshund instead of a son.

Other relatives

Uncle Max

Calvin's Uncle Max appeared in a series of strips in 1988, visiting the family. Uncle Max is the older brother of Calvin's father, though he is established as single and childfree. When Calvin (who first suspected Max was a con man trying to swindle them) guesses that Max had been in jail (to explain why he hasn't met Max), his mother is outraged, while his father seems to agree with Calvin, saying "with Max, that's not a bad guess".

Watterson has said Uncle Max was meant to be included in further strips, such as where the family would go to Max's home to pay him a visit; he never appeared again because Watterson felt that it was strange for Max to be unable to refer to the parents with proper names, and that the character never provided the new material for Calvin that he had hoped for.

Max is drawn to resemble Calvin's dad, but with a moustache instead of glasses. The two are modeled after Watterson, who wore both.

Grandparents
A few strips mention Calvin's grandparents. One example, which Watterson selected for reproduction in the Tenth Anniversary Book, features Calvin telling Hobbes describing his Grandfather's complaints about comic strips: newspapers print them too small, and now they look like Xeroxed talking heads. Hobbes then tells Calvin that his grandfather takes comic strips seriously; Calvin says as a result, his mother is looking into nursing homes.

Susie Derkins

Susie Derkins is a classmate of Calvin who lives in his neighborhood. She is the only recurring character in the comic strip to have both a forename and a surname revealed (other characters are mentioned briefly). Named after Watterson's in-laws' family beagle, she first appeared early in the strip as a new student in Calvin's class, but in later strips speaks as a longtime neighbor. In contrast to Calvin, she is polite and diligent in her studies, and her imagination usually seems mild-mannered and civilized, consisting of games such as playing "house" or having tea parties with her stuffed animals. Her parents are referred to several times in the strip, but have not appeared other than one brief shot of her mother's legs while talking to Calvin.

Susie is frequently the victim of Calvin's derision and plots, and is also often willing to retaliate when provoked. Most commonly, Susie will be the target of Calvin's water balloons or snowballs. Calvin often goes to great lengths to disgust or annoy Susie, as when founding his and Hobbes' club 'G.R.O.S.S.' (Get Rid Of Slimy GirlS) expressly to exclude her. Susie is Calvin's equal (and often superior) in cunning, often turning his plans into ignominious defeats. The two sometimes speak at their bus stop, where both usually become exasperated at each other; and at the lunch table at school, where Calvin deliberately grosses Susie out with fictitious descriptions of his lunch. Susie sometimes argues in academia's favor when Calvin says disparaging things about school, and on at least two occasions worries that Calvin's antics will affect her own academic progress.

Watterson has said he suspects that Calvin and Susie may have a crush on each other, and that "this encourages Calvin to annoy her". This love/hate relationship is most obvious in a Valentine's Day strip in which Susie seems to appreciate "a hate mail valentine and a bunch of dead flowers", and Calvin rejoices inwardly when she retaliates. In another strip, Calvin calls Susie for help with homework, and she teases him that he missed "the melodious sound of [her] voice". During one series of strips Calvin modifies his "duplicator" to copy only his good side; this well-dressed, polite, and very-intelligent version of Calvin soon becomes besotted with Susie, and is mystified by her hostile reaction.

Mr. Bun

Mr. Bun is Susie's stuffed rabbit, which frequents her tea parties as a guest. Unlike Hobbes, Mr. Bun is never shown as a living character, and Hobbes once described Mr. Bun as "comatose". This is used for comedic effect occasionally, as when Susie, playing "House" with Calvin, attempts to use Mr. Bun as their baby child, only to have Calvin refuse to recognize him as a human infant—with the entire strip, including the rabbit, drawn in a realistic style à la Rex Morgan, M.D..

Miss Wormwood

Miss Wormwood is Calvin's schoolteacher. Watterson commented that a few astute fans of the strip have correctly asked him if Miss Wormwood was named after the apprentice demon in C. S. Lewis' The Screwtape Letters. She usually wears polka-dotted dresses, and serves as a foil to Calvin's mischief. Despite the changing seasons and recurring holidays, the characters in Calvin and Hobbes do not age, and so Calvin and Susie return to Miss Wormwood's first-grade class every fall.

Miss Wormwood is rarely sympathetic to the trouble Calvin has in school, and comes across as a rather strict, sour character. She often calls on Calvin to answer questions, to catch him off guard, to which Calvin either replies with an excuse ("Hard to say, Ma'am. I think my cerebellum just fused."), or takes solace in the world of Spaceman Spiff or another alter ego. She is quick to send Calvin to the principal's office at the first sign of trouble. Calvin apparently takes joy in being the reason why Miss Wormwood mixes different stress-related medications (she "drinks Maalox straight from the bottle") and heavily smokes cigarettes ("Rumor has it she's up to two packs a day, unfiltered.") Calvin's antics leave Miss Wormwood anxious for retirement (one strip has her chanting in her head, "Five years until retirement, five years until retirement, five years until retirement..."). Regarding the difficulties of reining in rambunctious students, she once commented that "it's not enough that we have to be disciplinarians. Now we need to be psychologists." However, she does praise Calvin whenever he does apply himself or get an answer right, as her main concern is education and not putting Calvin down (though Calvin believes otherwise).

Moe

Moe is a bully in Calvin's school. His frequently monosyllabic dialogue is shown in crude, lower-case letters. Watterson describes Moe as "every jerk I've ever known". Moe is the only minor character in the strip who hurts Calvin without being provoked, and is also the only significant character never portrayed sympathetically.

Stephan Pastis of the 2000s comic Pearls Before Swine has cited Watterson and Calvin and Hobbes as among his many influences; in particular, the Zeeba Zeeba Eata fraternity of crocodiles is identified with Moe, even speaking in the same typeface.

Rosalyn

Rosalyn, the last of the significant recurring characters to appear, is a high school senior and the only babysitter able to tolerate Calvin's antics. Rosalyn is perhaps the only character in the strip whom Calvin really fears (other than Moe, the school bully). Introduced in an early strip, Watterson found her ferocity and intimidation of Calvin surprising, and he brought her back periodically in increasingly elaborate story-lines. Watterson described their relationship as "one-dimensional", although in her final appearance Rosalyn agrees to play a game of Calvinball, and in so doing, becoming the only character in the strip, other than Hobbes, to truly engage with Calvin on his own terms.

Calvin is often terrified of her, calling her a "sadistic kid-hater" and a "barracuda in a high-school-senior suit"; but in the final Rosalyn story, their opposition is averted by a game of Calvinball, which Rosalyn wins. In nearly all the "Rosalyn stories", Rosalyn is shown demanding advance payment and raises in wage from Calvin's parents, supposedly to pay for college or for the hard work necessary to control Calvin. (For the same reason, she briefly appears as Calvin's swimming instructor.) In at least four stories, Rosalyn telephones her boyfriend, Charlie, to cancel prearranged meetings which she cannot fulfill. (Charlie remains an unseen character.) Calvin sometimes urges Charlie to stop courting Rosalyn, on grounds that Rosalyn is sadistic and/or insane. The collection Revenge of the Baby-Sat took its name from a storyline in which Calvin steals her study notes and threatens to flush them down the toilet bowl.

Rosalyn's demands for higher pay to baby-sit Calvin have often been met with a small discussion between his parents. In one skit the mother tells her husband, "Pay  whatever it takes to get us out of here for the night." In the last cell of the Revenge of the Baby-Sat storyline, after paying her and looking into his now empty wallet, the father says, "Are you sure there's nobody else in this town willing to babysit Calvin?" To which the mother says, "Maybe you would like to spend a week on the phone?"

Other characters
The cast of principal, recurring characters in Calvin and Hobbes is limited; for example, in the Yukon Ho! collection, only five regular characters appear. Other characters who make infrequent or one-off appearances include the following.

Living food: Calvin often imagines that an oatmeal-like food comes to life, sometimes attacking him (or, in one case, reciting Hamlet's "To be, or not to be" soliloquy). Bill Watterson has said that his inspiration for this came from a cartoon drawn by himself in childhood, which featured living oatmeal.
Extraterrestrial life forms: Calvin encounters many extraterrestrial life-forms in the course of the strip, usually during adventures as his alter-ego, Spaceman Spiff. Most of these aliens are non-humanoid, bizarre monsters, but represent Calvin's imaginative perception of Susie, his parents, and teachers. During the story which gave the name to the Weirdos from Another Planet! collection, Calvin and Hobbes encounter a native Martian, who is a small creature with tentacles and eye-stalks. In the strip's final year, Watterson drew two stories involving recurring alien characters, Galaxoid and Nebular, to whom Calvin "sold" the Earth for 50 alien leaves to use for his science project, which he failed when his teacher rejected the leaves' origin. The donors returned in the final two weeks of strips, angry at Calvin for failing to reveal the changing seasons; but were placated when Hobbes clad them in Christmas stockings.
Doctor: Calvin occasionally visits his pediatrician, who appears to be a mild-mannered physician with a friendly demeanor. Calvin, however, sees him as a vicious, sadistic interrogator, sometimes imagining him as an alien or overreacting to playful diagnoses. The doctor made his final appearance when he diagnosed Calvin with chicken pox; he comments on the ability of a virus to "take the edge off a kid", as the illness has left Calvin without the energy to put up a fight.
Principal Spittle: Calvin's school principal usually makes his appearance when Calvin has upset Miss Wormwood; typically, he is seen looking over his desk as Calvin tries to explain his latest mishap, with an apathetic or infuriated expression in his face. He is seldom shown speaking except in his first appearance. He is depicted thinking to himself that he hates his job.
Mr. Lockjaw: Mr. Lockjaw is the gym teacher and coach of the baseball team at Calvin's school. He is a squat, burly man with little patience, and no sympathy for Calvin whenever Moe gets violent with him in gym class, with Calvin commenting that Lockjaw thinks "violence is aerobic." He does not stop Calvin's baseball teammates from abusing and teasing him, and when Calvin leaves the team, Lockjaw calls him a "quitter". This emotional trauma leads Calvin to create Calvinball, supposedly the least organized sport.
Scouts: Early in the strip, Watterson shows Calvin participating with other children in Cub Scout activities in the woods. Watterson thought at the time that Scouting might offer some potential for interesting adventures, but eventually abandoned the idea, considering it uncharacteristic of Calvin to join an organization.
Susie's mom: She is shown from the waist down in a foiled attempt to pester Susie, and is also seen having a brief dialogue during Susie's first experience with Calvin's alter-ego, Stupendous Man.
Substitute teachers: Occasionally, Calvin's class will have a substitute teacher. Only one, Mr. Kneecapper, was named; Calvin tricked Susie into believing that Mr. Kneecapper cooked rowdy students into the cafeteria meatloaf. In one set of strips, an unnamed woman is substituting; she looks through some notes Miss Wormwood left and inquires which child Calvin is. Later, Hobbes asks Calvin what he thought of her, Calvin replies he is unsure as "she went home at noon."
The monsters under the bed: the primary villains of the comic strip, along with Moe: a diverse set of bizarre-looking photophobic creatures, who live under Calvin's bed and periodically plan to eat Calvin, but are outwitted by him on each occasion. Only two of the monsters have names; one is Maurice, and another Winslow.
Calvin's bicycle: A supporting villain, it will frequently chase (and even sometimes run over) Calvin, destroying household items or injuring Calvin himself.
Other Students: Calvin's classmates, like his teacher, are assumed to be the same every year as no time appears to pass in the comic strip. Some of the students who do have names are - Tommy Chestnutt, whom Calvin claims Hobbes ate when he made fun of him, Filthy Rich, who Calvin claims some bullies got by grabbing him at the drinking fountain,  Candace, who has the desk nearest Susie, Ronald, whom Calvin uses as the butt of his "invisible Cretinizer" joke, Jessica , whom in one story arc Susie passes gossip notes to via Calvin, and another student named Tommy whom Calvin claims squirted milk out his nose while telling a funny story. Most of these are only mentioned by name in conversation. Apart from Candace and Ronald, those who do physically appear in the strip remain unnamed. This includes Calvin's baseball teammates, who bully him off the team after he makes a rookie mistake, and kids on the playground who usually are antagonistic to Calvin as well.

References

Calvin and Hobbes
Calvin and Hobbes
American comics characters